John Roy Fidler  (8 August 1891 – 17 March 1973) was an Australian politician.

He was born in Gladstone, Tasmania. In 1946 he was elected to the Tasmanian House of Assembly as a Liberal member for Darwin. He held the seat until his defeat in 1956. Fidler died in Hobart in 1973.

References

1891 births
1973 deaths
Australian Members of the Order of the British Empire
Liberal Party of Australia members of the Parliament of Tasmania
Members of the Tasmanian House of Assembly
20th-century Australian politicians